Sir Pelham Francis Warner,  (2 October 1873 – 30 January 1963), affectionately and better known as Plum Warner or "the Grand Old Man" of English cricket, was a Test cricketer and cricket administrator.

He was knighted for services to sport in the 1937 Coronation Honours.

Early life

Warner was born in Port of Spain, Trinidad, the youngest of 21 children. His mother, Rosa Cadiz, was a Spanish woman, and his father Charles Warner, was from an English colonial family. He was educated in Barbados at Harrison College, and then sent to England to Rugby School and Oriel College, Oxford.

Cricket career

As a right-hand batsman, Warner played first-class cricket for Oxford University, Middlesex and England. He played 15 Test matches, captaining in 10 of them, with a record of won 4, lost 6. He succeeded in regaining The Ashes in 1903–04, winning the series against Australia 3–2. However he was less successful when he captained England on the tour of South Africa in 1905–06, suffering a resounding 1–4 defeat, the first time England had lost to South Africa in a Test match. He was also to have captained England on the 1911–12 tour of Australia, but fell ill. He was unable to play in any of the Tests, with Johnny Douglas taking over the captaincy.

He was named Wisden Cricketer of the Year in 1904 and also in 1921, making him one of two to have received the honour twice (the usual practice is that it is only won once: the other is Jack Hobbs). The second award marked his retirement as a county player after the 1920 season, in which he captained Middlesex to the County Championship title.

In the mid-1920s he was Chairman of Selectors, and in 1926 during industrial strife served as a Special Constable. He did not, however, play in another first-class fixture until 1926–27, when he captained a Marylebone Cricket Club (MCC) side to Argentina, in which the four representative matches against the host nation were accorded first-class status.  MCC scraped a win in the series by two games to one, with one match drawn. He played one more first-class match, in 1929 for the MCC against the Royal Navy.

Cricket management

After retiring as a player, he became a tour manager, most notably on the infamous "Bodyline" tour of Australia in 1932–33. He was the chairman of the England Test selectors for several years in the 1930s. He later became President of the Marylebone Cricket Club. He was knighted for his services to cricket in 1937.

Cricket writing

Warner wrote extensively on cricket. He detailed his Ashes Tests and a history of Lord's Cricket Ground. He founded The Cricketer magazine. He was cricket correspondent of the Morning Post from 1921 to 1933, and subsequently of the Daily Telegraph.

Family life

He married Agnes Charlotte Blyth in the summer of 1904 and had two sons, Esmond and John, and a daughter, Elizabeth. He died, aged 89, at West Lavington, West Sussex.

His brother Aucher Warner not only captained the first combined West Indies side in the West Indies during the 1896–97 season (playing against A. A. Priestley's XI and for Trinidad vs. Lord Hawke's touring team, which included Pelham Warner) but also the first West Indian touring side to England in 1900.

Marina Warner, novelist and mythographer, is his granddaughter.

References

External links

The Golden Age of Cricket 1890–1914 by David Frith,

Bibliography
Lord's 1787–1945 

Trinidad and Tobago knights
Cricket historians and writers
England Test cricketers
English cricketers of 1890 to 1918
Cricketers who made a century on Test debut
England Test cricket captains
English cricketers
Middlesex cricket captains
Free Foresters cricketers
Oxford University cricketers
Presidents of Middlesex County Cricket Club
Presidents of the Marylebone Cricket Club
Wisden Cricketers of the Year
People educated at Rugby School
Alumni of Oriel College, Oxford
Knights Bachelor
Cricket players and officials awarded knighthoods
English cricket administrators
People of the Victorian era
Trinidad and Tobago people of British descent
Trinidad and Tobago people of English descent
Trinidad and Tobago people of Spanish descent
1873 births
1963 deaths
England cricket team selectors
Gentlemen cricketers
British special constables
Marylebone Cricket Club cricketers
Gentlemen of England cricketers
Lord Hawke's XI cricketers
C. I. Thornton's XI cricketers
North v South cricketers
Middlesex cricketers
Lord Londesborough's XI cricketers
P. F. Warner's XI cricketers
People educated at Harrison College (Barbados)
A. J. Webbe's XI cricketers
Marylebone Cricket Club Australian Touring Team cricketers
Pelham